Trichopselaphus is a genus of beetles in the family Carabidae, containing the following species:

 Trichopselaphus erwinorum Ball, 1978
 Trichopselaphus gloriosus Ball, 1978
 Trichopselaphus magnificus Ball, 1978
 Trichopselaphus meyeri Ball, 1978
 Trichopselaphus minor Bates, 1882
 Trichopselaphus stockwelli Ball, 1987
 Trichopselaphus subiridescens Chaudoir, 1843
 Trichopselaphus woldai Ball, 1987

References

Harpalinae